Leadgate is a small hamlet located at the foot of Hartside Fell between the town of Alston and the village of Garrigill in the parish of Alston Moor in Cumbria, England. It was the location of the earliest named mill on Alston Moor, referred to as Blackburn Mill in 1590, situated on the Black Burn beck and still shown as a corn mill on the 1861 1:2500 scale Ordnance Survey map.

The Hartside Fell is a prominent feature of the area. The cafe burnt down in 2018.

References

External links

Hamlets in Cumbria
Eden District